Universal Jobmatch was a British website for finding job vacancies. The site was developed in a collaboration between the Department for Work and Pensions and Monster.

History

The concept
The website replaced the JobCentre Plus' Job Search Tool and Employer Services Direct, which were part of the Directgov online system set up in the UK's New Deal employment system.  The service has been introduced as part of a Government campaign to assist the DWP to monitor client's jobsearch activities directly, and as part of the "Digital By Default" agenda to migrate more British citizens to subscribe to an online process when claiming both unemployed and in-work benefits. The service was switched prematurely live through an AlphaTesting System in November 2012, was commended as being a perfect system by Secretary of State for Work and Pensions George Iain Duncan Smith in November 2012, but remains a work in progress. Whereas, in parallel to the switching of Universal Jobmatch, the DWP closed its existing processes supporting Job Search and Employer Services Direct, migrating its customers to the new system, and reported that 460,000 employers posting jobs and the site receiving over 6 million searches per day. By February 2013 there were some 2 million registered users., although ambiguity remains with these figures. When Universal Jobmatch was introduced, the DWP migrated existing users of its Employer Services Direct service to Universal Jobmatch, thereby inflating the database of registered users.

Development
However, from the outset of the Alpha Testing System being promoted as being live in November 2012, whereas Universal Jobmatch may generate a number of job leads, and whereas each Job Lead may require candidates to apply for a job through an external website, there is no guarantee that, upon visiting the web site, the Job Lead will still exist. Indeed, some jobs advertised on Universal Jobmatch result in multiple clicks and multiple tabs as they initially open a job aggregating website which links to a recruitment agency website which then links to an employers website and the application made is not recorded in the Universal Job Match necessitating the user to have to manually type in a report of their application. The Monster Corporation (which operates the system on behalf of the Department of Works and Pensions) makes it clear when candidates sign up to the system that "they do not accept liability or responsibility for any financial consequences".

Early teething problems
Early controversy has arisen due to people having registered with Universal Jobmatch and then finding that they are targeted by dubious organisations and individuals in financial scams. Channel 4 news ran a feature, in December 2012, which explained how this new government service was being used to obtain personal details of jobseekers. Instead of resolving this issue, the Monster Corporation which operates the system on behalf of the Department for Work and Pensions (DWP) require all users, when creating an account, to accept a number of terms and conditions of use, including the clause that they "don't accept liability for loss or damage incurred by users of the website.

The  Universal Jobmatch states regularly as of January 2013 that users must "Never ever give out things like scanned passports, national insurance numbers or bank account details until a job offer has officially been made." on their relevant web pages. The site was also made a lot more user-friendly and less verbose in mid 2013.

Tender Controversy
On 12 February 2014, it was revealed in a Freedom of Information Act request  that Monster didn't win the Universal Jobmatch Tender falling into last place on value and second to last place on evaluation scoring; until the service was put back out to tender.

The Government paid Methods Consulting Limited and Jobsite UK (Worldwide) Limited £950,000 compensation, who should have won both tenders,  when the new contract was awarded. To date, the Government hasn't specified its reason for placing the contract back out to tender but the fact it paid compensation seems to suggest it wasn't the private company at fault.

Concerns are raised how Monsters "satisfactory" evaluation score and high bid in the first tender, resulted in a near-perfect evaluation score in the second tender and a bid of under half the original which in turn made them competitive. Allegations of insider dealing and corruption has been made because of this.

Mooted demise
According to a report in The Guardian in March 2014, leaked documents from the DWP indicate that the government had formulated plans to scrap Universal Jobmatch when the contract for the site was up for renewal in 2016, due to the numbers of fake and repeat job adverts posted to the site and because of cost concerns.

Replacement

On 26 April 2018 a message was placed on the home page saying the service would be replaced by 'Find a job' on 14 May 2018. Users were advised to save their information by 17 June 2018 as logins would not be moved to the new system.

Who can use it and why
It was not a requirement to register, and anonymous searches could be made by people looking for jobs and applications made directly to companies that had posted their contact details. However, as of 1 March 2013 JobCentre Plus advisers could, if giving a good reason, require Jobseeker's Allowance claimants to use the site through a JobSeeker Direction. If they refused to comply, they could be recommended for a benefit sanction. A decision-maker took the final decision over whether benefit should be removed, which as a consequence of the UK Governments Welfare Reform Bill of 2012, may have led to a loss in State Benefits for up to 3 years.

Registered users had the option to allow the DWP to have access to their account to allow the department to monitor their activity. Whilst this was not mandatory, claimants were threatened with a sanction for not doing so.

Hacktivists
Additionally, hacktivists have created an plug-in addition for the Chrome Browser which will allow the automatic distribution of CVs to any recruiters through Universal Jobmatch.

References

External links
https://www.gov.uk/jobseekers-allowance
https://www.gov.uk/jobsearch
https://jobsearch.direct.gov.uk/Home.aspx

Business services companies established in 2012
2012 establishments in the United Kingdom
Department for Work and Pensions
Employment agencies of the United Kingdom
Government services web portals in the United Kingdom
Internet properties established in 2012
Unemployment in the United Kingdom
Welfare state in the United Kingdom
Employment websites in the United Kingdom
Business services companies disestablished in the 21st century